"Shattered (Turn the Car Around)" is the second single and second track from rock band O.A.R.'s sixth studio album All Sides (2008).

Background and composition

Singer Marc Roberge explained the song is about blaming other people for holding yourself back, and then realizing at the end that it is your own problem if you are holding back in your life.  Strata frontman Eric Victorino posted on his social media that he co-wrote the song, including the line ‘turn the car around’ but received no credit or royalties. The song's music had added with guitars and piano. The song is written in the key of B major.

Track listing
Atlantic CD single Catalog No. 51131

 "Shattered (Turn the Car Around)" [Radio Edit] – 4:00

Music video
The video, shot in July 2008, was directed by Danny Clinch. It consists of stop-motion, blurred footage of lead singer Marc Roberge walking around New York City. It also includes footage of the band performing the song atop a building and Roberge standing in the rain.

Chart positions

Weekly charts

Year-end charts

References

2008 singles
2008 songs
O.A.R. songs
Songs written by Gregg Wattenberg
Atlantic Records singles
Rock ballads